Yeh Rishta Na Tootay is a 1981 Indian Hindi-language romantic musical film directed by K. Vijayan. It stars Rajendra Kumar, Mala Sinha, Vinod Mehra, Bindiya Goswami, Raj Babbar in lead roles. The film's music is by Kalyanji-Anandji.

Plot

Cast 
 Rajendra Kumar as Inspector Vijay
 Mala Sinha as Madhu
 Vinod Mehra as Ram
 Bindiya Goswami as Kiran
 Raj Babbar as Shyam
 Shakti Kapoor as Shakti
 Jagdeep as Bhagwandas
 Kalpana Iyer

Reception 
The film garnered 5.0 rating out of 5.0 at Bollywood Movie Database.

Soundtrack 
Music of the film was composed by the duo of Kalyanji Anandji and songs were written by Maya Govind and Anjaan.

References

External links 
 

1980s Hindi-language films
1981 films
Films directed by K. Vijayan
Films scored by Kalyanji Anandji
Hindi films remade in other languages